Megatibicen pronotalis, or Walker's cicada, is a species of cicada in the family Cicadidae. It is found in the northern Great Plains of the United States.

Notes
M. pronotalis is often associated with riparian Populus and Salix. It is reportedly among the loudest insects in the world.

References

Further reading

External links

 

Insects described in 1938
Cryptotympanini